Kandice Melonakos (born December 20, 1987), better known by her stage name Lola Blanc, is an American singer, songwriter, director, writer, podcaster, and actress. As a musician, she has been declared a "rising star" by Playboy, and "one to watch" by Ladygunn Magazine. Blanc co-wrote Britney Spears' top 40 single "Ooh La La".

Blanc has appeared on such television shows as American Horror Story: Hotel; she has also contributed writing for Vice.com, having written about a number of topics including ageism in the music industry and her experience with believing in a cult leader.

In 2019, Blanc co-founded Fatale Collective, an all-female horror filmmaking collective. Their debut anthology short film, "Bleed", went to Fantastic Fest and a number of other genre film festivals, also winning the Director's Award for Cinematic Achievement in a Short Film at FilmQuest.

Early life
Blanc was born in Bavaria, Germany but raised primarily on a farm in Fremont, Michigan. Brought up Mormon by a Greek-American father who was in the CIA and a motivational speaker mother, she spent much of her childhood writing songs and performing as a ventriloquist and auctioneer with her mother and brother, who performed magic and escape art.

When Blanc was a pre-teen, her mother was targeted by a religious impostor posing as a true LDS prophet who played on her beliefs and lured her into his web. Blanc found their letters and believed in him, too; she was temporarily separated from her mother, who was coerced into human trafficking until an accomplice who had a change of heart saved her. They were promptly reunited. Eventually Lola moved to Los Angeles, where she now resides, to pursue music full-time.

Music and career
Lola Blanc has written songs alongside producers and songwriters such as Sophie, Ammo, Fernando Garibay, Jimmy Harry, Jon Levine, TheFatRat and more.

Blanc originally co-wrote Britney Spears' single Ooh La La with Fransisca Hall and producer Ammo for her own project; the title was intended to be a play on her name. When Dr. Luke heard it, he thought it'd be perfect for Spears and brought in songwriters Bonnie McKee and J. Kash to rewrite the lyrics so they would better suit Spears and The Smurfs 2.

Acting
Blanc has made appearances on television shows such as American Horror Story: Hotel and Life in Pieces on CBS; she has also acted in several indie features and shorts. In 2011, she played Green-Eyed Girl in filmmaker Joshua Leonard's movie, The Lie. In 2015, she played The Undertaker in Max Landis' online short "Wrestling Isn't Wrestling". In 2021 she appeared in the feature film Venus as a Boy starring Ty Hodges and Olivia Culpo.

Collaborations
Blanc has been photographed and filmed for a number of fashion and beauty brands, including Vera Wang Princess, Make Up For Ever, Pinup Girl Clothing, and Lime Crime Makeup. YouTube celebrity makeup artist Michelle Phan has used several of Blanc's songs (Shangri-La, April Fools, and Bad Tattoo) in her tutorial videos.

Blanc has also starred in a number of music videos; she plays the lead role in the Interpol music video for "Lights" and the Tiger Army video for "Prisoner of the Night", among others; she is also featured in the LMFAO music video for "Sexy and I Know It", as well as the Lifehouse music video for "Halfway Gone".

References

External links

 

Living people
American women singer-songwriters
American women pop singers
1987 births
American people of Greek descent
People from Fremont, Michigan
21st-century American actresses
Female models from Michigan
American synth-pop musicians
American dance musicians
American electronic musicians
American indie pop musicians
Ventriloquists
American women in electronic music
Singer-songwriters from Michigan
21st-century American women singers